Battle River Regional Division No. 31 or Battle River School Division is a public school authority within the Canadian province of Alberta operated out of Camrose.

See also 
List of school authorities in Alberta

References

External links 

 
Camrose, Alberta
School districts in Alberta